Lewis Bartholomew Woodruff (June 19, 1809 – September 10, 1875) was a United States circuit judge of the United States Circuit Courts for the Second Circuit.

Education and career

Born on June 19, 1809, in Litchfield, Connecticut, Woodruff received a Bachelor of Arts degree in 1830 from Yale University and graduated from Litchfield Law School in 1832. He entered private practice in New York City, New York from 1832 to 1849. He was a Judge of the Court of Common Pleas of New York City from 1849 to 1855. He was a justice of the New York City Superior Court from 1856 to 1861. He resumed private practice in New York City from 1861 to 1868. He was a Judge of the New York Court of Appeals from 1868 to 1869.

Federal judicial service

Woodruff was nominated by President Ulysses S. Grant on December 8, 1869, to the United States Circuit Courts for the Second Circuit, to a new seat authorized by 16 Stat. 44. He was confirmed by the United States Senate on December 22, 1869, and received his commission the same day. His service terminated on September 10, 1875, due to his death at his summer residence in Litchfield, from the effects of a complicated disorder of the kidneys which had confined him to the house since the early spring.

Honor

Woodruff received the honorary degree of Doctor of Laws from Columbia University in 1860.

Family and church

For some years before his death, Woodruff was an elder of the Collegiate Reformed Church. Woodruff married Harriette B. in November 1835, she being the daughter of New Jersey Supreme Court Chief Justice Joseph Coerten Hornblower of Newark, New Jersey. She died April 5, 1868. They had three children.

References

Sources

External links
 
 Yale Obituary Record

1809 births
1875 deaths
19th-century American judges
Judges of the United States circuit courts
Litchfield Law School alumni
Judges of the New York Court of Appeals
New York Supreme Court Justices
Politicians from Litchfield, Connecticut
Lawyers from New York City
United States federal judges appointed by Ulysses S. Grant
Yale University alumni